Bushburg (formerly spelled Bushberg) is an unincorporated community in Jefferson County, in the U.S. state of Missouri.

History
A post office called Bushberg was established in 1868, and remained in operation until 1904. The community derives its name from Isador Bush, the operator of a local plant nursery.

References

Unincorporated communities in Jefferson County, Missouri
Unincorporated communities in Missouri